Ella Friend is an Australian rules footballer playing for the St Kilda Football Club in the AFL Women's (AFLW). Friend was recruited by St Kilda with the 4th pick in the 2022 AFL Women's draft.

AFL Women's career
Friend debuted for the Saints in the fourth round of the 2022 AFL Women's season. On debut, Friend collected 7 disposals and 2 tackles.

Statistics
Updated to the end of S7 (2022).

|-
| 2022 ||  || 16
| 7 || 0 || 0 || 41 || 22 || 65 || 12 || 8 || 0.0 || 0.0 || 5.9 || 3.1 || 9.0 || 1.7 || 1.1 || 0
|-
| S7 (2022) ||  || 16
| 9 || 0 || 0 || 47 || 13 || 60 || 15 || 15 || 0.0 || 0.0 || 5.2 || 1.4 || 6.7 || 1.7 || 1.7 || 0
|- class=sortbottom
! colspan=3 | Career
! 16 !! 0 !! 0 !! K !! H !! D !! M !! T !! 0.0 !! 0.0 !! 5.5 !! 2.2 !! 7.7 !! 1.7 !! 1.4 !! 0
|}

References

External links
 Ella Friend at AustralianFootball.com
 

2003 births
Living people
St Kilda Football Club (AFLW) players
Australian rules footballers from Victoria (Australia)